Cerapachys sulcinodis is a South and South-East Asian species of Dorlyine ant first described by Emery in 1889. Colonies comprise up to 2000 workers.

Foraging ecology 
C. sulcinodis is a non-army ant Doryline. Workers are diurnal and forage in groups of up to 100. They attack colonies of ants and also feed on other arthropods. Foraging, and colony productivity is high in the rainy season and pauses for the dry season.

References 

Dorylinae
Insects described in 1889